Ingeborg "Inge" Bauer, née Exner (born 24 June 1940, in Dittmannsdorf) is a retired East German pentathlete.

She won the bronze medal at the 1966 European Championships with 4713 points and finished seventh at the 1968 Summer Olympics with 4849 points.

She competed for the athletics team SC Motor Jena during her active career.

References 

 

1940 births
Living people
People from Karviná District
Silesian-German people
East German pentathletes
Olympic athletes of East Germany
Athletes (track and field) at the 1968 Summer Olympics
European Athletics Championships medalists